20,000 Species of Bees  is a 2023 Spanish drama film written and directed by Estibaliz Urresola Solaguren in her debut feature and starring Sofía Otero, Patricia López Arnaiz, Ane Gabarain and Itziar Lazkano. The film narrates the story of Lucía, a eight-year-old girl, who is in quest for identity. During a summer in a village house linked to beekeeping, she explores her femininity alongside the women of her family who at the same time reflect on their own femininity.

It was selected to compete for the Golden Bear at the 73rd Berlin International Film Festival, where it had its world premiere on 22 February 2023. Nine-year old Sofía Otero won the Silver Bear for Best Leading Performance for the role of Lucía. The film was also nominated for Best Feature Film Teddy Award. Estibaliz Urresola Solaguren, the first feature director was nominated for GWFF Best First Feature Award in the festival. In March 2023, the film won Golden Biznaga for Best Spanish Film at the 26th Málaga Film Festival, an annual film festival held in Málaga, Spain. It is scheduled to release in Spain cinemas on 21 April 2023.

Cast

 Sofía Otero as Lucía
 Patricia López Arnaiz as Ane
 Ane Gabarain as Lourdes
 Itziar Lazkano as Lita
 Sara Cózar as Leire
 Martxelo Rubio as Gorka
 Miguel Garcés 
 Unax Hayden 
 Andere Garabieta

Production

In July 2021, Estibaliz Urresola Solaguren was selected in the Mediterranean Film Institute (MFI), MFI Script 2 Film Workshops, which focuses on the field of training, specialising in script and project development. She also took part in the Berlinale Co-Production Market, feature-film project in 2022. The film was one of the 19 official selected  projects for the 2022 Berlinale Co-Production Market. Inicia Films and Gariza Films took charge of the production.

The cast was finalized as: Sofía Otero as Lucía, Patricia López Arnaiz as Ane, Ane Gabarain as Lourdes, Itziar Lazkano as Lita, Sara Cózar as Leire
Martxelo Rubio as Gorka along with  Miguel Garcés, Unax Hayden and Andere Garabieta.

Shooting locations included Laudio and Hendaye.

Release

20,000 Species of Bees had its world premiere on 22 February 2023 as part of the 73rd Berlin International Film Festival, in competition. It also made it to the 26th Málaga Film Festival's main competitive slate. It is scheduled to release theatrically in Spain on 21 April 2023.

It was reported on 14 January 2023 that Paris-based Luxbox has acquired the international sales right of the film, whereas BTeam Pictures will release the film in Spain.

Reception

On the review aggregator Rotten Tomatoes website, the film has an approval rating of 100% based on 9 reviews, with an average rating of 6.7/10.

Alfonso Rivera reviewing for Cineuropa praised Estibaliz Urresola Solaguren writing, "the filmmaker addresses plurality, exploration and transformation with a stratospheric sensitivity." Rivera praising performances of Patricia López Arnaiz, Ane Gabarain  and Sofía Otero wrote, "superb work by her actresses, but there are not enough adjectives to commend Sofía Otero (keep an eye on her, it is impossible not to succumb to her talent)." Nicholas Bell in IonCinema.com graded the film 3/5 and wrote, "Touching and without being overly sentimental, Solaguren uses the titular diversity of bees to suggest our authentic roles all play an important part if we are to move beyond surviving to actually thriving". Jordan Mintzer of The Hollywood Reporter calling the film "A compassionate coming-of-ager" praised the performances of: Sofía Otero writing, "The endearing Otero, who makes her screen debut, is clearly the centerpiece of the film" and for Patricia López Arnaiz writing, "effortlessly playing a mother in the midst of a midlife crisis that becomes transformative as well." Concluding Mintzer opined, "20,000 Species of Bees returns to Ane’s loving — most memorably at the very close of the film when she not only firmly stands by her youngest child’s bold decision, but appears to be empowered by it." Further adding, "As are we." The film featured in compilation '15 films that stood out at Berlin 2023' of  ScreenDaily. Lee Marshall for Screen International in his review praised Otero performance writing, "Sofia Otero is never less than compelling, her face a deep pool that becomes a magnet for the audience". In concluding paragraph, she referred to the scene that featured towards the end in Víctor Erice's 1973 classic The Spirit of the Beehive and Frankenstein, where people go in the search for a missing girl and wrote, "It’s a masterful touch in an engaging, authentic, moving film about the way society persists in seeing monsters where there are none."

Accolades

Listicle

See also 
 List of Spanish films of 2023

References

External links

 
 
 20,000 Species of Bees at Berlinale
 20,000 Species of Bees at Production Incia Films
 

2023 films
2020s Spanish films
Spanish drama films
2023 drama films
2020s Spanish-language films
2023 LGBT-related films
Spanish LGBT-related films
2023 directorial debut films
LGBT-related drama films
Films shot in the Basque Country (autonomous community)
Films shot in Nouvelle-Aquitaine